Harwood is both a surname and occasional given name. Notable people with the name include:

Surname
A. R. Harwood "Dick Harwood" (1897–1980), Australian film director
Andrew Harwood (television host) (1945–2008), Australian quiz show host, announcer and actor
Andrew Harwood (cricketer) (born 1964), English cricketer
Andrew A. Harwood (1802–1884), admiral in the United States Navy
Aurelia Harwood (1865–1928), American conservationist and educator
Barney Harwood (born 1979), English television presenter
Basil Harwood (1859–1949), English organist and composer
Benjamin F. Harwood (c. 1818 – 1856), New York lawyer
Bo Harwood, American composer
Bruce Harwood (born 1963), Canadian actor
Busick Harwood (c. 1745 – 1814), English physician
Caroline Harwood, American microbiologist
Charles Harwood (1880–1950), Governor of the United States Virgin Islands
Daniel Harwood (born 1984), American professional wrestler
Edgar N. Harwood (1854–1936), Justice of the Montana Supreme Court
Edward Harwood (fl. 1769), British theologian
Edward Harwood (of Darwen) (1707–1787), English composer
Edward C. Harwood (1900–1980), American economist
Elizabeth Harwood (1938–1990), English opera soprano
George Harwood (1845–1912), British businessman and politician
Gwen Harwood (1920–1995), Australian poet and librettist
Guy Harwood (born 1938), British racehorse trainer
Henry Harwood (1888–1950), British naval officer
Henry R. Harwood (c. 1831–1898), Australian actor and theatre manager
Henry Stanislas Harwood (1838–1911), Canadian politician
Hokimate Harwood, New Zealand Māori scientist
H. M. Harwood (1874–1959), British businessman, playwright, screenwriter and theatre manager
John Harwood (journalist) (born 1956), American Journalist
John Harwood (writer) (born 1946), Australian poet and novelist
John Berwick Harwood (1828–1899), English writer
Justin Harwood, New Zealand guitarist
Kate Harwood (fl. since 2005), British television producer
Keith Harwood (1950–1977), recording engineer
Kenneth Harwood (born 1924), American administrator
Lee Harwood (born 1939), British poet
Lee Harwood (footballer) (born 1960)
Lucy Harwood (1893–1972), English artist
Malcolm Harwood (born 1938), English poker player
Matire Harwood, New Zealand general practitioner and researcher
Max Harwood (born 1997), English actor
Michael Harwood (guitarist) (born 1975), guitarist for the band Ultra
Michael Harwood (RAF officer) (born 1958)
Mike Harwood (born 1959), Australian golfer
Nancy Harwood (born 1948), American Playboy centerfold
Richard Harwood (born 1979), British cellist
Richard Harwood, pseudonym of Richard Verrall (political writer) (born 1948), English politician and Holocaust denier
Robert Harwood (1826–1897), Canadian politician
Robert Unwin Harwood (1798–1863), Canadian politician
Ronald Harwood (1934–2020), British playwright and writer
Ryan Harwood (born 1991), Australian rules footballer
Shane Harwood (born 1974), Australian cricketer
Shuna Harwood (born 1940), British costume designer
Simon Harwood, British police officer involved in the death of Ian Tomlinson
Tom Harwood (born 1996), British political commentator
Thomas Harwood (died 1652), Virginia colonial politician
Vanessa Harwood (born 1947), Canadian ballet dancer and choreographer
Victoria Harwood (born 1961), voice actress
William Henry Harwood (1840–1917), English entomologist

Given name
Harwood Greenhalgh (1849–1922), English footballer
Sir Harwood Harrison (1907–1980), British politician
Harwood Jarvis (1884–1936), Australian cricketer
Harwood Sturtevant (1888–1977), American bishop
Harwood Williams (born 1970), Kittitian cricketer

See also
Harewood (surname)
Haywood (surname)
Henwood (surname)
Heawood

Surnames
Given names
Surnames of English origin
Surnames of British Isles origin
English-language surnames
English masculine given names